Deans is an unincorporated community located within South Brunswick Township in Middlesex County, New Jersey, United States.

Deans originated from its location on both Crosswicknung Trail (Georges Road) and Lawrence Brook. Dams were built on the brook, creating Deans Pond. The center of the community is centered about the intersection of Deans Lane (County Route 610) and Georges Road (CR 697). CR 610 continues east from the community on Deans Rhode Hall Road; other transportation facilities that pass near Deans include U.S. Route 130 just east of the community and the Northeast Corridor railroad to the west (a station serving the community once existed). Residential homes dot the area around Deans but some businesses line nearby arterial roads and large warehouses are situated along Industrial Way at US 130.

Demographics

References

South Brunswick, New Jersey
Unincorporated communities in Middlesex County, New Jersey
Unincorporated communities in New Jersey